Ari Marcopoulos (born Aristos) is an American self-taught photographer, adventurer and film artist. Born in the Netherlands, he is best known for presenting work showcasing elusive subcultures, including artists, snowboarders and musicians. He lives and works in New York.  Marcopoulos is represented by Fergus McCaffery in New York and Tokyo, and Galerie Frank Elbaz in Paris.

Early life 
Marcopoulos was born in Amsterdam, The Netherlands, in 1957. His father was from Greek origin and was born in Egypt. He was a pilot and moved to The Netherlands to work for KLM. In The Netherlands, he met a young Dutch model, Marcopoulos's mother. His parents had three sons, including Ari, and one daughter.

Marcopoulos moved to New York City in 1980 when he was 23 years old. There, he was first exposed to the burgeoning hip-hop and downtown art scenes of 1980s New York. His reasoning behind the move was due to cultural frustrations in his home country of Holland, Marcopoulos recalls, "...in Holland, things were pretty stale for me. Even though there were a lot of good influences and a certain openness to music and art and literature, I just wanted to go somewhere less familiar–somewhere bigger. Holland is a fairly small country, and in a weird way, somewhat conservative...There isn't much flexibility in changing people's perspectives."

After emigrating to the United States, Marcopoulos first was hired as a printing assistant to Andy Warhol. Two year later, he became the photo assistant to  photographer Irving Penn. He quickly became a part of the downtown arts scene that included artists such as Jean-Michel Basquiat, Keith Haring, and Robert Mapplethorpe. Marcopoulos credits Warhol in teaching him the value of photographing every-day objects and people, and Penn in showing him the power of a simplistic approach to photography.

Work and career 
Family and friends have been both muses and subject-matter throughout his career as a photographer. His landscapes and portraiture offer straightforward takes on everyday life and the creativity of people in the margins.

Hip-hop culture 
Once Marcopoulos moved to New York City, he began to photograph the locals he encountered in the street, which exposed him to the up-and-coming downtown artist and hip-hop scenes of the 1980s. There he met and photographed portraits of pioneering rap icons including The Fat Boys, the Beastie Boys, Rakim, Public Enemy, Ratking and LL Cool J.

His photo documentation of the Beastie Boys touring and recording between their albums, Check Your Head and III Communication can be found in his book, Pass The Mic: Beastie Boys 1991-1996.

Marcopoulos's best known hip-hop collaboration was shooting the cover photo for American rapper Jay-Z’s twelfth studio album, Magna Carta Holy Grail in 2013. The cover photo features the marble statue of Alpheus and Arethusa by Florentine sculptor Battista Loenzi.

Skater culture 
In the early 1990s, Marcopulos met and befriended skaters cycling at the legendary local spot dubbed “The Banks” found underneath the Brooklyn Bridge. He shot portraits of New York skate icons Harold Hunter and Justin Pierce, both featured in Larry Clark's 1995 coming-of-age film Kids.

He has frequently collaborated with the skateboarding fashion label, Supreme. The brand has created several collections of hooded sweatshirts, t-shirts, Vans sneakers, and hats that have featured Marcopoulos's photography.

In 2017, Marcopoulos collaborated with Adidas Skateboarding to release a limited footwear and apparel collection featuring his photographs from the ‘90s.

Snowboard culture 
In 1995, Marcopoulos was contacted by Burton Snowboards to shoot their new snowboarding catalogue. Despite not knowing how to ski or snowboard, the photographer agreed to the project and taught himself how to snowboard. The artist stated his experience, “I didn’t approach [snowboarding] as a sport, I approached it as a lifestyle,” he says. “That’s what I liked about snowboarding – a bunch of kids travelling around the world in their own community. They were just living their own life without their parents around – a community of people living and working together and seeing each other in different places.”

Books 
Marcopoulos has published over 200 books and limited edition zines as well as books in collaboration with artists like Fumes with Matthew Barney, an in-depth look at Barney's studio process captured through photographs shot over the course of four years and "the Ecstasy of St. Kara" with Kara Walker.

In 2019, Marcopoulos continued his collaboration with Gucci with his book Dapper Dan's Harlem, which featured original photography of the neighborhood, as well as portraits of friends of Gucci and Dapper Dan, including director and designer Trevor Andrew, artist and author Cleo Wade, restaurateur and chef Marcus Samuelsson, and businessman and author Steve Stoute.

Exhibitions 
Marcopoulos's first mid-career survey in 2009 was curated by Stephanie Cannizzo for the Berkeley Art Museum and Pacific Film Archive in Berkeley, California.

Marcopoulos has been a featured artist in the 2002 and 2010 Whitney Biennial.

Solo exhibitions 

 2005-2006: Ari Marcopoulos, MoMA PS1, New York 
2008: Ari MAarcopoulos: Fear God, The Project, New York 
2009: Ari Marcopoulos: Within Arm's Reach, Berkeley Art Museum & Pacific Film Archive, Berkeley 
2011: Ari Marcopoulos: Abandoned Sleep, Ratio 3, San Francisco 
2011: Ari Marcopoulos, White Columns, New York 
2011: Ari Marcopoulos: This Week, Galerie Franz Elbaz, Paris 
2015: Ari Marcopoulos: L1032015, Marlborough, New York 
2017: Ari Marcopoulos: Machine, Galerie Frank Elbaz, Paris 
2017: Ari Marcopoulos: Machine, Fondation d'Entreprise Ricard, Paris 
2019: Ari Marcopoulos. Films. Photographs., Fergus McCaffrey, New York 
 2019: Ari Marcopoulos. 3 Films. 3 Photographs., Fergus McCaffrey, Tokyo

Filmography

Short films

Music videos 

 1992: Beastie Boys, "Gratitude", Check Your Head 
 1992: Beastie Boys, "Something's Got To Give", Check Your Head 
2013: Ratking, "Piece of Shit" 
2014: Ratking, "Canal"

Books (selection) 

 1987: Portraits from the studio and the street 
2000: Transitions and exits 
2001: Pass the mic : Beastie Boys, 1991-1996 
2005: Out & about 
2005: Even the president of the United States sometimes has got to stand naked 
2007: Ad Rock 
2008: The chance is higher 
2009: Ari Marcopoulos: within arm's reach: [exhibition] 
2015: Fumes: Ari Marcopoulos, Matthew Barney Studio 
2016: Rome - Malibu 
2016: Ari Marcopoulos: not yet 
 2018: The Athens dialogues

Personal life 
Marcopoulos has been in a relationship with American contemporary artist Kara Walker since 2015.

He has two sons, Cairo and Ethan, from his previous marriage to Jennifer Goode. Both sons have been heavily featured in Marcopoulos's photography work.

Marcopoulos lives in New York City.

References

American photographers
Living people
1957 births
American contemporary artists
Artists from the San Francisco Bay Area
Dutch emigrants to the United States